Richard John Walters (born November 15, 1961) is an American film and television actor, best known for playing Harry Warden in the 2009 horror film, My Bloody Valentine 3D.

Biography
Walters was born in Pittsburgh, Pennsylvania. Walters attended the West Virginia University and Duquesne University School of Law earning the Juris Doctor degree. He is licensed to practice law in Pennsylvania. Walters enjoys playing the guitar, ballroom dancing, wrestling, rugby, crew, skiing, and swimming.

Filmography

References

External links

1961 births
American male film actors
American male television actors
Male actors from Pittsburgh
Living people
West Virginia University alumni